Baby, also known as A. G. Baby is an Indian film director, producer, actor and scriptwriter who works in the Malayalam film industry. He has directed more than 50 Malayalam movies. Among the popular movies he directed are Lisa (1978), Pappu (1980), Abhinayam (1981) and Veendum Lisa (1987).

Filmography

Direction

 Manushyaputhran (1973)
 Sapthaswaragal (1974)
 Sankhupushpam (1977)
 Sooryakanthi (1977)
 Lisa (1978)
 Kaathirunna Nimisham (1978)
 Avano Atho Avalo (1979)
 Prabhu (1979)
 Pambaram (1979)
 Anupallavi (1979)
 Tharangam (1979)
 Sarppam (1979)
 Love in Singapore (1980)
 Chandrahaasam (1980)
 Pappu (1980)
 Manushya Mrugam (1980)
 Nizhal Yudham (1981)
 Abhinayam (1981)
 Karimpoocha (1981)
 Saravarsham (1982)
 Amrutha Geetham (1982)
 Samrambham (1983)
 Mortuary (1983)
 Gurudakshina (1983)
 Kurishuyudham (1984)
 NH 47 (1984)
 Oru Sumangaliyude Kadha (1984)
 Onnaamprathi Olivil (1985)
 Bhagavaan (1986)
 Ithu Oru Thudakkam Maathram (1986)
 Veendum Lisa (1987)
 Pathimoonam Number Veedu (1990; Tamil)
Raktha Jwala (1990; Telugu)
 House No. 13 (1991)
 Manmadha Sarangal (1991)

Screenplay
 Sapthaswaragal (1974)
 Lisa (1978)
 Avano Atho Avalo (1979)
 Prabhu (1979)
 Anupallavi (1979)
 Pappu (1980)
 Love in Singapore (1980)
 Abhinayam (1981)
 Karimpoocha (1981)
 Saravarsham (1982)
 Veendum Lisa (1987)

Production
 Chirikkudukka (1976)
 Nirakudam (1977)
 Lillyppookkal (1979)
 Veendum Lisa (1987)

Acting
 Chithramela (1967)
 Yogamullaval (1971)
 Brahmachaari (1972)
 Rakshassu (1984)

Story
 Sarppam (1979)
 Abhinayam (1981)
 Veendum Lisa (1987)

Editing
 Swargaraajyam (1962)

Camera
 Swargaraajyam (1962)

Dialogue
 Abhinayam (1981)

References

External links

Malayalam film directors
Malayalam screenwriters
Malayalam film producers
Male actors from Thiruvananthapuram
Male actors in Malayalam cinema
Indian male film actors
Living people
Year of birth missing (living people)
Place of birth missing (living people)
Film directors from Thiruvananthapuram
Film producers from Thiruvananthapuram
20th-century Indian film directors
20th-century Indian male actors
Screenwriters from Thiruvananthapuram
20th-century Indian dramatists and playwrights